The 2011–12 season is Persiraja Banda Aceh's 1st season since the inception of the Indonesian Premier League.

Players

First team squad

Transfer
Out:

Matches

Indonesian Premier League

Results summary

Table

Fixtures and results

First round

Second round

2012 Piala Indonesia

Second round

Results
First Leg

Second Leg

Third round

Results
First Leg

Second Leg

References

Persiraja Banda Aceh seasons
Persiraja Banda Aceh